Margaret Carnegie Miller (March 30, 1897 – April 11, 1990) was the only child of industrialist and philanthropist Andrew Carnegie and Louise Whitfield, and heiress to the Carnegie fortune.

A native of Manhattan, New York City, from 1934 to 1973, Miller was a trustee of the Carnegie Corporation of New York, a grant-making foundation.  The foundation was established by her father in 1911.  From 1973 until her death in 1990, she was an honorary lifetime trustee.

Personal life
On April 22, 1919, four months before her father's death, Margaret married Roswell Miller Jr. (1894-1983) at the Carnegie family home at 2 East 91st Street on Upper East Side.  Officiating at the wedding were Rev. William Pierson Merril, pastor of the Brick Presbyterian Church, where Margaret and Mrs. Carnegie were members, and Rev. Henry Sloane Coffin, pastor of the Madison Avenue Presbyterian Church where Mr. Carnegie was a member.  Margaret Carnegie's marriage to Roswell Miller ended in divorce in 1953. During the divorce, she lost her Atlantic Beach summer house.  Miller had four children: Louise, Roswell III, Barbara, and Margaret, three grandchildren: Gail Boggs, Barbara Sanders and Pamela Morrison Mitchell. Great grandchildren: Andrew Boggs, Morgan Boggs, Laura Draper, Courtney Sweeney, Dylan Evans.

Death
Miller died on April 11, 1990, at her home in Fairfield, Connecticut, at the age of 93.

References

External links 

New York Times Obituary on April 21, 1990
American Experience
Genealogy

1897 births
1990 deaths
Andrew Carnegie
Philanthropists from New York (state)
American people of Scottish descent
People from Fairfield, Connecticut
People from the Upper East Side
Carnegie family
Presbyterians from New York (state)
20th-century Presbyterians
People from Atlantic Beach, New York
Trustees